This is a list of Spanish television related events in 2022.

Events 
 20 April -  Borja Prado is appointed chariman of Mediaset España.
 14 May - Chanel performing the song SloMo representes Spain at the Eurovision Song Contest 2022 ranking 3rd.
 22 June - Spanish Parliament passes Law 13/2022, regarding Audiovisual Media Services.
 7 July - MFE - MediaForEurope, italian Company belonging to Silvio Berlusconi increases its share capital on Mediaset España up to 82,92%.
 27 September - Elena Sánchez Caballero is appointed interim President of RTVE.
 17 October – It is revealed that Paolo Vasile will cease as CEO of Mediaset España after 23 years in office.

Debuts

Television shows

Ending this year

Deaths 
 14 January - Carmen de la Maza, actress, 81.
 16 January - Ivanka Marfil, secretary in Un, dos, tres... responda otra vez, 59.
 26 January - Arturo Arribas, actor, 56.
 9 February - Alicia Hermida, actress, 99.
 11 February - Isabel Torres, actress, 52.
 24 March - María Fernanda D'Ocón, actress, 84.
 3 April - Silvia Gambino, actress, 57.
 6 April - Pilar Sanjurjo, meteorogist, 79.
 7 April - José Luis Fradejas, host, 71.
 28 April - Juan Diego, actor, 79.
 10 May - Jesús Mariñas, journalist, 79.
 12 June - Miryam Romero, journalist, 59.
 22 June - José Luis Balbín, journalist, 81.
 24 July - Berta Riaza, actress, 94.
 25 July - Pedro Valentín, actor, 81.
 6 August - Mario Beut, host, 89.
 1 October - Àngel Casas, host, 76.
 3 October - Jesús Quintero, host, 82.
 9 October - Francisco Merino, actor, 91.
 17 October - Claudio Biern Boyd, producer and cartoonist, 81.
 19 November - Santiago Vázquez, host, 91.
 30 December - Pepa Palau, 84. Actress and presenter

See also
2022 in Spain
List of Spanish films of 2022

References 

2022 in Spanish television